Lakomaa is a Finnish surname. Notable people with the surname include:

 Aarne Lakomaa (1914–2001), Finnish aircraft designer
 Erik Lakomaa (born 1977), Swedish scholar and political consultant

Finnish-language surnames